Digidentis is a genus of sea slugs, dorid nudibranchs, shell-less marine gastropod mollusks in the family Chromodorididae. This genus has become a synonym of Thorunna Bergh, 1878

Species 
Species in the genus Digidentis previously included:
 Digidentis arbuta (Burn, 1961): synonym of Thorunna arbuta (Burn, 1961)
 Digidentis kulonba  Burn, 1966: synonym of Doriprismatica kulonba (Burn, 1966)
 Digidentis perplexa  Burn, 1957: synonym of Thorunna perplexa (Burn, 1957)

References

 Johnson R.F. & Gosliner T.M. (2012) Traditional taxonomic groupings mask evolutionary history: A molecular phylogeny and new classification of the chromodorid nudibranchs. PLoS ONE 7(4): e33479

Chromodorididae